Heinz Beck may refer to:
 Heinz Beck (footballer)
 Heinz Beck (chef)